The Lenoir–Rhyne Bears are the athletic teams that represent Lenoir–Rhyne University, located in Hickory, North Carolina, in intercollegiate sports at the Division II level of the National Collegiate Athletic Association (NCAA). The Bears have primarily competed in the South Atlantic Conference since the 1989–90 academic year.

Lenoir–Rhyne competes in 23 intercollegiate varsity sports. Men's sports include baseball, basketball, cross country, football, golf, lacrosse, soccer, swimming, tennis, and track and field (indoor and outdoor); while women's sports include basketball, cross country, golf, lacrosse, soccer, softball, swimming, tennis, track and field (indoor and outdoor), triathlon, and volleyball.

Conference affiliations 
 South Atlantic Conference (1989–present)

Varsity teams

Baseball 
Lenoir–Rhyne has had 7 Major League Baseball Draft selections since the draft began in 1965.

Football

Notable alumni

Football 
 Tommy Laurendine

Men's basketball 
 Rick Barnes
 Eddie Holbrook

Men's soccer 
 Oriol Cortes
 Cameron Saul

References

External links